Kendal Nathaniel "Tiny" Pinder (born 25 April 1956) is a Bahamian former professional basketball player.

Early life
Pinder was born in The Bahamas.

College career
Pinder played four seasons of college basketball in the United States, first for Miami Dade College between 1975 and 1977 and then for the North Carolina State Wolfpack between 1977 and 1979.

Pinder was selected in the fifth round of the 1979 NBA draft by the Atlanta Hawks.

Professional career
For the 1979–80 season, Pinder played in Israel for Hapoel Jerusalem. He led the Israeli League in scoring with 586 points.

Between 1980 and 1983, Pinder performed with the Harlem Globetrotters.

For the 1984–85 season, Pinder played in Finland for Turun NMKY. His 32.8 points per game was second in the Korisliiga, while his 14.8 rebounds per game led the league.

Pinder moved to Australia in 1985 and played eight straight seasons in the NBL. In 1985 and 1986, he played for the Sydney Supersonics. In his first season, he was named All-NBL First Team and NBL scoring champion.

In 1987, Pinder joined the Perth Wildcats. He was named the Wildcats' Club MVP in 1989 and helped the Wildcats win back-to-back NBL championships in 1990 and 1991. His final season with the Wildcats came in 1992. He was named in the Wildcats' 30th Anniversary All-Star Team.

In 1995, Pinder had a five-game stint with the Illawarra Hawks, which marked his final NBL season.

Personal life
Pinder has 12 children. His son Keanu is also a professional basketball player.

Sexual assault offences
In 1992, Pinder faced charges of attempted sexual assault. He was convicted by the Western Australian Supreme Court and was sentenced to 18 months' jail. In 1996, he was sentenced to five years' jail for sexual offences involving a 15-year-old girl. In 2001, he was acquitted in the New South Wales District Court on a charge of raping a 19-year-old woman the previous year. In 2013, he was arrested on a charge relating to an alleged rape in 1987. He was cleared in August 2016.

In 2021, Pinder was arrested and charged with stalking a woman in Sydney. He was sentenced to 15 months' imprisonment.

References

External links
NBL profile
andthefoul.net profile
Finnish League profile

1956 births
Living people
African-American basketball players
Atlanta Hawks draft picks
Bahamian men's basketball players
Bahamian criminals
Bahamian expatriate basketball people in the United States
Bahamian people imprisoned abroad
Centers (basketball)
Hapoel Jerusalem B.C. players
Harlem Globetrotters players
Israeli Basketball Premier League players
Miami Dade Sharks men's basketball players
NC State Wolfpack men's basketball players
Perth Wildcats players
Power forwards (basketball)
Prisoners and detainees of Western Australia
Illawarra Hawks players
People acquitted of rape
People convicted of sexual assault